The 1971–72 Nationalliga A season was the 34th season of the Nationalliga A, the top level of ice hockey in Switzerland. Eight teams participated in the league, and HC La Chaux-de-Fonds won the championship.

First round

Final round

Relegation

External links
 Championnat de Suisse 1971/72

Swiss
National League (ice hockey) seasons
Nationalliga A season